Manolis Stefanoudakis ( born 5 April 1983) is a Paralympian athlete from Greece who competes in category F54 throwing events. He won a bronze and a gold medal in the javelin throw at the 2012 and 2016 Paralympics, respectively.

Personal history
Stefanoudakis was born in Heraklion, Greece in 1983. He suffered permanent spinal chord injuries after a traffic accident in 2007.

Athletics career

Stefanoudakis took to para-sport after his accident as a way for improving his health. He first tried our swimming, but a lack of facilities curtailed this option. He took to athletics instead and by 2010 he was classified as a F54 athlete and was competing at meets. Stefanoudakis represented Greece at the 2012 Summer Paralympics in London. There he competed in both the F54-56 Shot put and the F54/55/56 javelin throw, winning bronze in the latter with a distance of 27.37 metres. As well as Paralympic success, Stefanoudakis has also won medals at both World and European Championships level. His most notable achievement in athletics outside the Paralympics was a gold medal in the T54 javelin at the 2015 Championships in Doha.

References

Paralympic athletes of Greece
Athletes (track and field) at the 2012 Summer Paralympics
Paralympic bronze medalists for Greece
Paralympic gold medalists for Greece
Living people
1983 births
Medalists at the 2012 Summer Paralympics
Medalists at the 2016 Summer Paralympics
Greek male javelin throwers
Greek male shot putters
Athletes from Heraklion
Paralympic medalists in athletics (track and field)
Athletes (track and field) at the 2020 Summer Paralympics
Wheelchair shot putters
Wheelchair javelin throwers
Paralympic shot putters
Paralympic javelin throwers
21st-century Greek people